Hancock County Courthouse may refer to:

 Hancock County Courthouse (Georgia), Sparta, Georgia
 Hancock County Courthouse (Indiana), Greenfield, Indiana, site of some public art in Indiana
 Hancock County Courthouse (Iowa), Garner, Iowa
 Hancock County Courthouse (Kentucky), Hawesville, Kentucky
 Hancock County Courthouse (Mississippi), Bay St. Louis, Mississippi a Mississippi Landmark
 First Hancock County Courthouse, Findlay, Ohio
 Hancock County Courthouse (Ohio), Findlay, Ohio